On September 25, 2021, at approximately 3:55 p.m. Mountain Daylight Time, Amtrak passenger train 7/27, the westbound Empire Builder, carrying 141 passengers and 17 crew members, derailed west of the town of Joplin, Montana, United States. The train consisted of two locomotives and ten cars, eight of which derailed. 

Three people were killed, and at least 50 others were injured, with seven of them being hospitalized.

Background

The Empire Builder is a long-distance passenger rail service operated by Amtrak traveling on tracks of the BNSF Railway between the cities of Chicago and Seattle or Portland. Trains are split or combined at Spokane, with the Portland section being at the rear of westbound trains.

The derailment occurred on the Hi-Line, a portion of the BNSF's Northern Transcon. BNSF conducted its most recent inspection of the section through Joplin on September 23, 2021. The last major Amtrak accident in Montana occurred in 1988, when an Empire Builder train hit a track buckle and derailed in Saco.

Derailment

The westbound Empire Builder train 7/27, operating with two P42DC locomotives (units #74 and #38) and 10 railcars (1 baggage car followed by 9 Superliners), was carrying 141 passengers and 17 crew members at the time of the derailment.

The rear four cars (a Sightseer Lounge, two coaches and a sleeper), all destined for Portland, tipped over after derailing. Three people on board were killed, and over 50 others were injured, including seven who were hospitalized. 

NTSB Vice Chairman Bruce Landsberg  stated that the Empire Builder derailment happened at a gradual right-hand curve, just prior to reaching a railroad switch at the entrance to a railway siding while travelling on the single-track mainline, contrary to previous speculation that a defect with the switch itself caused the accident. According to The New York Times, several passengers reported a "bumpy" ride before the derailment.

Response
Emergency personnel from six local counties were dispatched to the derailment site, and five hospitals were put on standby to treat injured passengers. Three people were transported to Benefis Hospital in Great Falls and two others were treated at Logan Health in Kalispell. Non-injured passengers were taken to the Liberty County Senior Center in Joplin, Chester High School in Chester, and hotels in Shelby. Residents of nearby communities provided food and assistance to passengers after an emergency siren alerted them to the incident. A section of nearby U.S. Route 2 was closed to allow for emergency access.

Amtrak announced the deployment of their Incident Response Team along with emergency personnel and agency leaders. Service was immediately suspended between Minot, North Dakota, and Shelby, Montana, and later Empire Builder trips were truncated to Minneapolis. Track repair crews from BNSF Railway were also brought to the site to replace damaged railroad ties and roadbed. The line was closed until September 28.

Investigations

As of September 26, 2021, at least two formal investigations into the incident were underway.

The National Transportation Safety Board (NTSB) opened an investigation into the derailment and dispatched a fourteen-person "go-team". Those investigators arrived on September 26 and were expected to remain on-site for approximately one week.
The NTSB team held their first press conference the following afternoon, after formally taking over the investigation from Liberty County Disaster and Emergency Services. 
A preliminary report was expected within 30 days.

The Federal Railroad Administration (FRA) announced on September 26 that it had sent a team of 18 technical experts to the site to initiate a forensic investigation that will also support the NTSB investigation.

Amtrak and BNSF each had their own investigators and incident response personnel on-site within one day of the derailment.

See also
 List of accidents on Amtrak

References

External links

Press conference videos / transcripts
NTSB; September 27, 2021: 

Train derailment
2021 road incidents
2021 disasters in the United States
Accidents and incidents involving Amtrak
Derailments in the United States
2021 train derailment
Railway accidents and incidents in Montana
Railway accidents in 2021
Road incidents in the United States
September 2021 events in the United States